Air sacs are spaces within an organism where there is the constant presence of air. Among modern animals, birds possess the most air sacs (9–11), with their extinct dinosaurian relatives showing a great increase in the pneumatization (presence of air) in their bones. Theropods, like Aerosteon, have many air sacs in the body that are not just in bones, and they can be identified as the more primitive form of modern bird airways. Sauropods are well known for the large number of air pockets in their bones (especially vertebra), although one theropod, Deinocheirus, shows a rivalling number of air pockets.

Function 

From about 1870 onwards scientists have generally agreed that the post-cranial skeletons of many dinosaurs contained many air-filled cavities (postcranial skeletal pneumaticity), especially in the vertebrae. Pneumatization of the skull (such as paranasal sinuses) is found in both synapsids and archosaurs, but postcranial pneumatization is found only in birds, non-avian saurischian dinosaurs, and pterosaurs.

For a long time these cavities were regarded simply as weight-saving devices, but Bakker proposed that they were connected to air sacs like those that make birds' respiratory systems the most efficient of all animals'.

John Ruben et al. (1997, 1999, 2003, 2004) disputed this and suggested that dinosaurs had a "tidal" respiratory system (in and out) powered by a crocodile-like hepatic piston mechanism – muscles attached mainly to the pubis pull the liver backwards, which makes the lungs expand to inhale; when these muscles relax, the lungs return to their previous size and shape, and the animal exhales. They also presented this as a reason for doubting that birds descended from dinosaurs.

Critics have claimed that, without avian air sacs, modest improvements in a few aspects of a modern reptile's circulatory and respiratory systems would enable the reptile to achieve 50% to 70% of the oxygen flow of a mammal of similar size, and that lack of avian air sacs would not prevent the development of endothermy. Very few formal rebuttals have been published in scientific journals of Ruben et al.’s claim that dinosaurs could not have had avian-style air sacs; but one points out that the Sinosauropteryx fossil on which they based much of their argument was severely flattened and therefore it was impossible to tell whether the liver was the right shape to act as part of a hepatic piston mechanism. Some recent papers simply note without further comment that Ruben et al. argued against the presence of air sacs in dinosaurs.

Evidence

Researchers have presented evidence and arguments for air sacs in sauropods, "prosauropods", coelurosaurs, ceratosaurs, and the theropods Aerosteon and Coelophysis.

In advanced sauropods ("neosauropods") the vertebrae of the lower back and hip regions show signs of air sacs. In early sauropods only the cervical (neck) vertebrae show these features. If the developmental sequence found in bird embryos is a guide, air sacs actually evolved before the channels in the skeleton that accommodate them in later forms.

Evidence of air sacs has also been found in theropods. Studies indicate that fossils of coelurosaurs, ceratosaurs, and the theropods Coelophysis and Aerosteon exhibit evidence of air sacs. Coelophysis, from the late Triassic, is one of the earliest dinosaurs whose fossils show evidence of channels for air sacs. Aerosteon, a Late Cretaceous allosaur, had the most bird-like air sacs found so far.

Early sauropodomorphs, including the group traditionally called "prosauropods", may also have had air sacs. Although possible pneumatic indentations have been found in Plateosaurus and Thecodontosaurus, the indentations are very small. One study in 2007 concluded that prosauropods likely had abdominal and cervical air sacs, based on the evidence for them in sister taxa (theropods and sauropods). The study concluded that it was impossible to determine whether prosauropods had a bird-like flow-through lung, but that the air sacs were almost certainly present. A further indication for the presence of air sacs and their use in lung ventilation comes from a reconstruction of the air exchange volume (the volume of air exchanged with each breath) of Plateosaurus, which when expressed as a ratio of air volume per body weight at 29 ml/kg is similar to values of geese and other birds, and much higher than typical mammalian values.

So far no evidence of air sacs has been found in ornithischian dinosaurs. But this does not imply that ornithischians could not have had metabolic rates comparable to those of mammals, since mammals also do not have air sacs.

Development

Three explanations have been suggested for the development of air sacs in dinosaurs:
 Increase in respiratory capacity. This is probably the most common hypothesis, and fits well with the idea that many dinosaurs had fairly high metabolic rates.
 Improving balance and maneuvrability by lowering the center of gravity and reducing rotational inertia. However this does not explain the expansion of air sacs in the quadrupedal sauropods.
 As a cooling mechanism. It seems that air sacs and feathers evolved at about the same time in coelurosaurs. If feathers retained heat, their owners would have required a means of dissipating excess heat. This idea is plausible but needs further empirical support.

Dinosaur respiratory systems with bird-like air sacs may have been capable of sustaining higher activity levels than mammals of similar size and build can sustain. In addition to providing a very efficient supply of oxygen, the rapid airflow would have been an effective cooling mechanism, which is essential for animals that are active but too large to get rid of all the excess heat through their skins.

Calculations of the volumes of various parts of the sauropod Apatosaurus’ respiratory system support the evidence of bird-like air sacs in sauropods:
 Assuming that Apatosaurus, like dinosaurs' nearest surviving relatives crocodilians and birds, did not have a diaphragm, the dead-space volume of a 30-ton specimen would be about 184 liters. This is the total volume of the mouth, trachea and air tubes. If the animal exhales less than this, stale air is not expelled and is sucked back into the lungs on the following inhalation.
 Estimates of its tidal volume – the amount of air moved into or out of the lungs in a single breath – depend on the type of respiratory system the animal had: 904 liters if avian; 225 liters if mammalian; 19 liters if reptilian.
On this basis, Apatosaurus could not have had a reptilian respiratory system, as its tidal volume would have been less than its dead-space volume, so that stale air was not expelled but was sucked back into the lungs. Likewise, a mammalian system would only provide to the lungs about 225 − 184 = 41 liters of fresh, oxygenated air on each breath. Apatosaurus must therefore have had either a system unknown in the modern world or one like birds', with multiple air sacs and a flow-through lung. Furthermore, an avian system would only need a lung volume of about 600 liters while a mammalian one would have required about 2,950 liters, which would exceed the estimated 1,700 liters of space available in a 30-ton Apatosaurus′ chest.

The palaeontologist Peter Ward has argued that the evolution of the air sac system, which first appears in the very earliest dinosaurs, may have been in response to the very low (11%) atmospheric oxygen of the Carnian and Norian ages of the Triassic Period.

References 

Anatomy